This is a list of major buildings at St. Elizabeths Hospital in Southeast Washington, D.C.

West Campus

East Campus

References 

Congress Heights
Psychiatric hospitals in Washington, D.C.
Unused buildings in Washington, D.C.
Former cemeteries in Washington, D.C.
Kirkbride Plan hospitals
Hospital buildings completed in 1855
Hospital buildings on the National Register of Historic Places in Washington, D.C.
Government buildings on the National Register of Historic Places in Washington, D.C.
National Historic Landmarks in Washington, D.C.
Historic districts in Washington, D.C.
Historic American Landscapes Survey in Washington, D.C.
American Civil War hospitals
Ezra Pound
Hospitals established in 1852
1852 establishments in Washington, D.C.
Gothic Revival architecture in Washington, D.C.
Italianate architecture in Washington, D.C.
Historically black hospitals in the United States
United States Marine Hospitals